The Korail Class 331000 trains are commuter electric multiple units in South Korea used on the Gyeongui·Jungang Line. Class 331000 trains were manufactured and delivered in 2009 and from 2012 to 2014 to provide service on the Gyeongui Line and to address progressing extensions starting from the extension to Gongdeok Station.

Technical details

Electrical parts 
All trains use IGBT controls and use passive cooling with a heat pipe. The trains are also equipped with regenerative braking, reducing energy consumption and simplifying train inspection, and they use electric door motors.

Interior design 
The Class 331000 trains sport a white-colored, fire-retardant interior. LCD monitor displays are installed on the side of each car for trains 331-01~331-13, and on the top of each car for trains 331-14~331-27. The end cars have a space for wheelchairs.

Cabin 
The Class 331000 trains share the same cabin design with the Class 321000 as many of the cars were derived from Class 331000 trains. Stop notifiers are installed, as are TGIS use color displays. Dead section notifiers are also installed.

Formation 
The Class 331000 trains are organized into two formations
 Trains 331-01~331-13 and 331-23~331-27, in an eight-car TC-M-M'-T-T-M-M'-TC formation.
 Trains 331-14~331-22, in a four-car TC-M'-M'-TC formation.

The symbols are defined below.
 M' car: Pantograph, main transformer, controller, motor
 M car: Motor, controller
 TC car: Secondary power device, air compressor, battery, cabin
 T car: trailer (unpowered)

The cars of each train are numbered to correspond to the type of car each car is:
3310XX - Tc (SIV, air compressor, battery)
3311XX - M (inverter)
3312XX - M' (pantograph, transformer, inverter)
3313XX - T (trailer)
3314XX - T (trailer) (this car on trains 331-14~331-22 are M' cars)
3315XX - M (inverter)
3316XX - M' (pantograph, transformer, inverter)
3319XX - Tc (SIV, air compressor, battery)

Depot 
The Class 331000 trains are stored at the Munsan train depot, which is a few kilometers south of Munsan Station.

Batches

1st batch 

The first batch of Class 331000 trains were introduced in 2009 for the opening of what was known the Gyeongui Line at the time.

The first batch trains are numbered 331-01~331-13. The trains have new, smoother aluminium bodies, but they use the same front end design as the third batch Class 321000 trains. The first batch trains have LCD display monitors on the sides (above the doors).

2nd batch 

The second batch of Class 331000 trains were introduced following the Gyeongui·Jungang Line's eastward extensions until Yongsan Station, when the Gyeongui Line became the Gyeongui·Jungang Line.

The second batch trains are numbered 331-14~331-27. The trains have LCD monitor displays are installed on the top of each car. The trains also use the same front end design as the third batch Class 321000 trains, but the exterior body was reverted to the standard, ribbed type stainless steel body seen on all new cars.

Train 331-27 was manufactured and delivered in late 2012 to address the extension from Digital Media City Station to Gongdeok Station. It was originally six cars long, but was lengthened to eight cars in November 2014.

Trains 331-14~331-22 were manufactured and delivered in late 2013 to expand the rolling stock on the (at the time) Gyeongui Line. These trains are only four cars long and operate on the Seoul Station branch of the Gyeongui·Jungang Line.

Trains 331-23~331-26 were originally manufactured in 2012, but each train was extended to eight cars in 2014. They were delivered in late 2014 address the extension from Gongdeok Station to Yongsan Station.

Derived units
The Korail Class 361000 trains use the 1st batch body design.

See also 
 Korail
 Gyeongui·Jungang Line

References

Electric multiple units of South Korea
Train-related introductions in 2009
25 kV AC multiple units
Hyundai Rotem multiple units